Harri Greville (born 28 November 1990) is a Welsh former professional rugby league footballer who played in the 2010s.

International honours
Harri Greville won a cap for Wales while at South Wales Scorpions in 2010.

References

External links
(archived by web.archive.org) Profile at scorpionsrl.com
(archived by web.archive.org) Scorpions Squad

1990 births
Living people
Rugby league players from Cardiff
Rugby league props
South Wales Scorpions players
Wales national rugby league team players
Welsh rugby league players